The Scottish Rite Temple, formerly the Fowler Methodist Episcopal Church, is a historic church building in the Lowry Hill neighborhood of Minneapolis, Minnesota, United States.  It was designed by architects Warren H. Hayes and Harry Wild Jones.  The original portion, the rear chapel, was designed by Warren H. Hayes and built in 1894.  When the congregation expanded and more funds were available, Harry Wild Jones designed an addition that expanded it to a much larger structure.  This was completed in 1906.

The Fowler congregation merged with the Hennepin Avenue Methodist Church in 1915, and the Scottish Rite Temple bought the building the next year.  They made some modifications to the auditorium to accommodate Masonic rituals, but most of the original features were kept, including extensive use of stained glass.  The exterior is built of hard quartzite from southwestern Minnesota, along with red sandstone trim.  It has two massive towers, three arches over the entry porch, and a  rose window. The church was listed on the National Register of Historic Places in 1976.

See also
 List of Masonic buildings in the United States
 List of Methodist churches in the United States
 National Register of Historic Places listings in Hennepin County, Minnesota

References

External links

1915 establishments in Minnesota
Clubhouses on the National Register of Historic Places in Minnesota
Churches in Minneapolis
Former churches in Minnesota
Former Methodist church buildings in the United States
Masonic buildings completed in 1906
Masonic buildings in Minnesota
Methodist churches in Minnesota
National Register of Historic Places in Minneapolis
Romanesque Revival church buildings in Minnesota
1906 establishments in Minnesota

zh:卫理公会福勒堂